The 2012 Boodles Challenge was an exhibition tournament held before Wimbledon to serve as a warm-up to players. Taking place from 19 June 2012 to 23 June 2012 at Stoke Park in London, it was the 11th edition of the Boodles Challenge. Marin Čilić won the title.

Participants
On 21 March 2012, the tournament organisers released a preliminary list of 5 players that will compete in the tournament:

  Juan Martín del Potro
  Alexandr Dolgopolov
  Richard Gasquet
  Gaël Monfils
  Stanislas Wawrinka

Later, between May and June, 6 more players were confirmed:

  Marin Čilić
  Novak Djokovic
  John Isner
  Andy Murray
  Gilles Simon
  Janko Tipsarević

Results

Day 1 (June 19)

Day 2 (June 20)

Day 3 (June 21)

Day 4 (June 22)

Day 5 (June 23)

References

External links
 Official website

Boodles Challenge
Boodles Challenge
Boodles Challenge
Boodles Challenge
Boodles Challenge